Shori railway station was a railway station located in Balochistan, Pakistan.

See also
 List of railway stations in Pakistan
 Pakistan Railways

References

Railway stations in Balochistan, Pakistan
Railway stations on Rohri–Chaman Railway Line